Salamajärvi National Park is a national park in the Central Ostrobothnia and Central Finland regions of Finland, in the municipalities of Perho, Kivijärvi and Kinnula. Salamajärvi is located in the rugged watershed region of Suomenselkä. This large, uninhabited area is especially known for its diverse mire ecosystems and its set of wilderness animals.

See also 
 List of national parks of Finland
 Protected areas of Finland

References

External links
 
 Outdoors.fi – Salamajärvi National Park

National parks of Finland
Protected areas established in 1982
Geography of Central Ostrobothnia
Geography of Central Finland
Kivijärvi
Perho
Kinnula
Tourist attractions in Central Finland Region
Tourist attractions in Central Ostrobothnia
1982 establishments in Finland
Ramsar sites in Finland